Asian Highway 31 or AH31 is a route running  from Belogorsk, Amur Oblast in Russia to Dalian, Liaoning Province in China. The route in China is considered as potential Asian highway as per map. Belogorsk to Blagoveshchensk section of this Asian highway is named after Amur river as Amur Highway .

Russia 
: Belogorsk – Blagoveshchensk, 
10K-243: Blagoveshchensk – border with China

China

: Heihe - Harbin (when complete)
At the moment Bei'an - Harbin runs through:  Bei'an North IC -  -  -  Hazhao IC
Within Harbin:  Hazhao IC - Harbin IC - Qunli IC - Harbin South JCT
: Harbin - Changchun - Shenyang
Within Shenyang:  Wangjiagou JCT - Shenyang East JCT - Xiashengou JCT - Jinbaotai JCT
: Shenyang - Dalian

Junctions
Russia
  near Belogorsk, Russia
China
  near Harbin
  near Changchun
  near Shenyang

See also
 Asian Highway 6
 Asian Highway 30
 List of Asian Highways

References

External links
 Treaty on Asian Highways with routes

Asian Highway Network
Roads in Russia
Roads in China